Mahendrapala II (944–948) ascended the throne of the Gurjara-Pratihara dynasty after his father Mahipala I. His mother was queen Prasadhana Devi. He reigned for short duration but the inscription found at Mandasor indicates that Gurjara Pratihara Empire extended up to Mandasor during his reign.

References

Pratihara empire
10th-century Indian monarchs